Lazar Veselinović (born 4 August 1986) is a Serbian professional footballer who plays as a striker, most recently for Borac Šajkaš, on loan from Proleter Novi Sad.

Honours

Club
Vojvodina
 Serbian Cup: 2013–14

Individual
 Serbian SuperLiga Team of the Season: 2012–13

References

External links
 HLSZ profile
 
 
 
 

1986 births
Living people
Footballers from Novi Sad
Serbian footballers
Serbian SuperLiga players
Association football forwards
Belarusian Premier League players
Expatriate footballers in Belarus
Expatriate footballers in Hungary
Expatriate footballers in South Korea
FC Dinamo Minsk players
FK ČSK Čelarevo players
FK Hajduk Kula players
FK Inđija players
FK Mladi Radnik players
FK Palić players
FK Proleter Novi Sad players
FK Spartak Subotica players
FK Vojvodina players
FK Rad players
K League 1 players
Mezőkövesdi SE footballers
Nemzeti Bajnokság I players
Pohang Steelers players
Serbia and Montenegro footballers
Serbian expatriate footballers
Serbian expatriate sportspeople in Belarus
Serbian expatriate sportspeople in Hungary
Serbian expatriate sportspeople in South Korea
Serbian First League players